Saving Mr. Banks: Original Motion Picture Soundtrack is the soundtrack album of the 2013 drama film Saving Mr. Banks, written and conducted by American film composer Thomas Newman.

The album features twenty-five tracks of Newman's score, as well as four re-recordings of songs written by Richard M. Sherman and Robert B. Sherman as performed by the film's cast, and two standalone songs ("One Mint Julep" and "Heigh-Ho"). Walt Disney Records released two editions of the soundtrack on December 10, 2013: a single-disc and a two-disc digipak deluxe edition, with the latter containing original demo recordings by the Sherman Brothers and selected songs from Mary Poppins.

Newman's score was critically lauded and received several accolade recognitions for Best Musical Score, including Academy Award, BAFTA, Grammy Award, and Critics' Choice Award nominations.

Track listing

Personnel

Thomas Newman – conductor
Michael Zainer – assistant music editor
Bill Bernstein – music editor
J.A.C Redford – orchestration
Bill Bernstein – producer
Matt Sullivan – music supervisor

Leslie Morris – orchestra contractor
Shinosuke Miyazawa – assistant engineer
Mitchell Leib – executive in charge of music
Scott Holtzman - music business affairs
Sylvia Krask -  music business affairs
Steve Gerdes – art direction

Reception

John Stanley of the San Francisco Chronicle positively compared Thomas Newman's music to the works of his father's [Alfred Newman]. Daniel Schweiger of Film Music Magazine, wrote that Newman's music was " a beautifully thematic, and anachronistically wondrous score".

Accolades

References

2013 soundtrack albums
Disney film soundtracks
Thomas Newman albums
Walt Disney Records soundtracks
Mary Poppins
Drama film soundtracks